The Urantia Foundation is a Chicago-based non-profit organisation, founded in 1950, that provides materials, promotes events, and provides guidance associated with The Urantia Book.

Purpose

The main purpose of the foundation is to provide for the dissemination of The Urantia Book and to ensure that the text remains as unaltered as possible. It published the first copy of the book to be made available to the public in 1955. The organization maintains integrity of the text and authorizes specific translations. The Urantia Foundation was inaugurated in order to preserve exclusive domain over the names "The URANTIA BOOK," "Urantia Brotherhood," "Urantia Foundation," and "Urantia Society" for at least one generation.

Copyright and trademarks

In 1995, a United States jury trial in Arizona found that the Urantia Foundation's 1983 renewal of the book's copyright was invalid. However, that decision was overturned on appeal.

In 2001, a United States jury trial in Oklahoma again found that the Urantia Foundation's 1983 renewal of the book's copyright was invalid.<ref name="court_decision_1">Michael Foundation, Inc. v. Urantia Foundation v. Harry McMullan, III  US District Court decision by jury that Urantia Foundation does not hold the copyright to The Urantia Book</ref> However, this decision was upheld in the United States Court of Appeals for the Tenth Circuit, creating a circuit split as to whether the English version of the book is considered to have entered the public domain in the US as of 1983.  In 2006, the international copyright on the English text expired.

The Urantia Foundation placed the three blue concentric circles logo on the cover of The Urantia Book'' and has a United States trademark for that symbol. The circles are also used with foundation approval to indicate other affiliated organizations.

See also
 Copyright on religious works

References

Further reading

External links
 Urantia Foundation

Foundations based in the United States
The Urantia Book
New Age organizations
1950 establishments in Illinois
Religious organizations established in 1950